Forsan is a city in Howard County, Texas, United States. The population was 210 at the 2010 census.

Geography

Forsan is located in southern Howard County at  (32.109359, –101.365531).

History
Forsan's development as a community dates back to the 1920s, when oil was discovered in the area. Oil companies began leasing local land and production from the first oil well began on November 9, 1925. On May 28, 1928, a town site on the ranch of Clayton Stewart  was placed on the market. An office was set up and lots were sold at twenty-five dollars each. By December 1928, the growing community was known as Forsan. The name was derived from the fact that four paying oil sands were believed to be present in the area. Drillers would later discover that there were actually at least five sands present. A school and several businesses opened soon after. On March 5, 1929, Forsan's post office began operating. A true oil boomtown, Forsan's population had already reached 350 by 1931. The Great Depression's impact on Forsan wasn't as significant as in other rural Texas towns. The population grew to 400 by 1936. That figure remained constant through the mid-1950s, but there was a decline in the number of businesses. The Elbow Common School District, based in the community of Elbow, consolidated with Forsan schools in 1960. On March 25, 1961, the first mayor and city council were elected following an earlier decision to incorporate the community. Forsan's population began to decline and by 1980, 239 people lived in the city. That number rose to 256 in 1990, but had declined to 226 in 2000.

Demographics

As of the census of 2000, there were 226 people, 84 households, and 69 families residing in the city. The population density was 778.8 people per square mile (300.9/km2). There were 96 housing units at an average density of 330.8 per square mile (127.8/km2). The racial makeup of the city was 97.79% White, 0.44% Native American, 0.44% from other races, and 1.33% from two or more races. Hispanic or Latino of any race were 12.39% of the population.

There were 84 households, out of which 41.7% had children under the age of 18 living with them, 66.7% were married couples living together, 11.9% had a female householder with no husband present, and 16.7% were non-families. 16.7% of all households were made up of individuals, and 8.3% had someone living alone who was 65 years of age or older. The average household size was 2.69 and the average family size was 2.96.

In the city, the population was spread out, with 31.9% under the age of 18, 4.9% from 18 to 24, 25.2% from 25 to 44, 23.5% from 45 to 64, and 14.6% who were 65 years of age or older. The median age was 37 years. For every 100 females, there were 94.8 males. For every 100 females age 18 and over, there were 97.4 males.

The median income for a household in the city was $36,000, and the median income for a family was $38,750. Males had a median income of $36,250 versus $17,250 for females. The per capita income for the city was $17,103. About 11.5% of families and 16.4% of the population were below the poverty line, including 30.4% of those under the age of eighteen and none of those 65 or over.

Education
Forsan is served by the Forsan Independent School District

Climate
According to the Köppen climate classification system, Forsan has a semiarid climate, BSk on climate maps.

References

External links
 History: The History of Forsan
 Forsan Independent School District 
 Texas handbook information

Cities in Texas
Cities in Howard County, Texas